Some of the constants used in science are named after great scientists. By this convention, their names are immortalised. Below is the list of the scientists whose names are used in physical constants.

List of the scientists and the physical constants

See also 
List of scientists whose names are used as SI units
List of scientists whose names are used as non SI units
List of people whose names are used in chemical element names
Unit of measurement

References and notes

Lists of things named after physicists
Scientists whose names are used in physical constants